The Chattahoochee County School District is a public school district in Chattahoochee County, Georgia based in Cusseta. It serves the communities of Cusseta and Fort Benning South.

All parts of the county except Fort Benning are zoned to county schools for all grades. Fort Benning children are zoned to Department of Defense Education Activity (DoDEA) schools for grades K-8. However Fort Benning high school students attend the public high schools in the respective counties they are located in.

Schools
The Chattahoochee County School District has one elementary school, one middle school, and one high school.

 Elementary school: Chattahoochee County Education Center
 Middle school: Chattahoochee County Middle School
 High school: Chattahoochee County High School

References

External links
 

School districts in Georgia (U.S. state)
Education in Chattahoochee County, Georgia